A Rank Outsider is a 1920 British silent sports film directed by Richard Garrick and starring Gwen Stratford, Cameron Carr and Lewis Dayton. It was based on a novel by Nathaniel Gould.

Cast
 Gwen Stratford as Myra Wynchmore 
 Cameron Carr as Captain Ferndale 
 Lewis Dayton as Guy Selby 
 John Gliddon as Ralph Wynchmore 
 Joe Plant as Dare Peters
 Miles Mander   
 Martita Hunt

References

Bibliography
 Low, Rachael. The History of British Film, Volume 4 1918-1929. Routledge, 1997.

External links

1920 films
British mystery films
Films directed by Richard Garrick
Films based on British novels
British black-and-white films
British silent feature films
1920s mystery films
1920s sports films
British sports drama films
1920s English-language films
1920s British films
Silent drama films
Silent mystery films
Silent sports films